Baugh City is an unincorporated community in Campbell Township, Warrick County, in the U.S. state of Indiana.

History

Baugh City was named after Floyd Oscar Baugh, who platted the town in the 1950s.

Geography

References

Unincorporated communities in Warrick County, Indiana
Unincorporated communities in Indiana